Liebermannacris is a genus of short-horned grasshoppers in the family Acrididae. There are at least two described species in Liebermannacris, found in South America.

Species
These species belong to the genus Liebermannacris:
 Liebermannacris dorsualis (Giglio-Tos, 1898)
 Liebermannacris punctifrons (Stål, 1878)

References

External links

 

Acrididae